"Darklands" is a song by Scottish rock band the Jesus & Mary Chain and the third single from their album of the same name. The single was released in October 1987 by Blanco y Negro Records on 7-inch vinyl, 10-inch vinyl, 12-inch vinyl and as a CD single. The 10-inch and the CD were entitled Darklands E.P.

The single reached number 33 on the UK Singles Chart and number 23 on the Irish Singles Chart. William Reid was the producer for all the tracks with Bill Price co-producing  "Darklands" and John Loder co-producing "Rider", "On the Wall (Porta Studio Demo)", "Here It Comes Again" and "Surfin' U.S.A. (April out-take)".

Track listings
All tracks were written by Jim Reid and William Reid except where noted.

7-inch single (NEG 29)
 "Darklands"
 "Rider"
 "On the Wall" (Porta Studio demo)

12-inch single (NEG 29T)
 "Darklands"
 "Rider"
 "Surfin' U.S.A." (April out-take) 
 "On the Wall" (Porta Studio demo)

10-inch and CD EP (NEG 29TE; NEG 29CD)
 "Darklands" – 5:23
 "Rider" – 2:10
 "Here It Comes Again" – 2:30
 "On the Wall" (Porta Studio demo) – 3:39

Personnel
The Jesus and Mary Chain
 Jim Reid – vocals, guitar
 William Reid – vocals, guitar, producer

Additional personnel
 Bill Price – producer ("Darklands")
 John Loder – producer ("Rider", "Here It Comes Again")
 Linda Reid – design
 Helen Backhouse – design

Charts

References

The Jesus and Mary Chain songs
1987 singles
1987 songs
Blanco y Negro Records singles
Songs about suicide
Songs written by Jim Reid
Songs written by William Reid (musician)